Iverson notation can refer to:
 APL (programming language)
 Iverson bracket, in mathematics